Events in the year 1966 in Brazil.

Incumbents

Federal government
 President: Marshal Castelo Branco 
 Vice President: 	José Maria Alkmin

Governors 
 Acre: vacant
 Alagoas: 
 till 31 January: Luis Cavalcante 
 31 January-15 August: João José Batista Tubino 
 starting 15 August: Antônio Simeão de Lamenha Filho
 Amazonas: Artur César Ferreira Reis (till 12 September); Danilo Duarte de Matos Areosa (from 12 September)
 Bahia: Lomanto Júnior  
 Ceará: 
 until 12 August: Virgilio Távora
 12 August-12 September: Franklin Chaves  
 from 12 September: Plácido Castelo
 Espírito Santo: Francisco Lacerda de Aguiar (until 5 April); Rubens Rangel (from 5 April)
 Goiás: Emílio Rodrigues Ribas Jr (until 31 January); Otávio Lage (from 31 January)
 Guanabara: Raphael de Almeida Magalhães (until 5 December); Francisco Negrão de Lima (from 5 December)
 Maranhão: Newton de Barros Belo (until 31 January); Jose Sarney (from 31 January)
 Mato Grosso: Fernando Corrêa da Costa then Pedro Pedrossian 
 Minas Gerais: José de Magalhães Pinto (until 31 January); Israel Pinheiro da Silva (from 31 January) 
 Pará: Jarbas Passarinho (until 31 January); Alacid Nunes (from 31 January)
 Paraíba: Pedro Gondim (until 31 January); João Agripino Maia (from 31 January)
 Paraná: Algacir Guimarães then Pablo Cruz Pimentel 
 Pernambuco: Paulo Pessoa Guerra 
 Piauí: 
 until 12 August: Petrônio Portella
 12 August-12 September: José Odon Maia Alencar
 from 12 September: Helvídio Nunes
 Rio de Janeiro: Pablo Torres (until 12 August); Teotonio Araujo (from 12 August)                                                                               
 Rio Grande do Norte: Aluízio Alves (until 31 January); Walfredo Gurgel Dantas (until 31 January)
 Rio Grande do Sul: Ildo Meneghetti (until 12 September); Walter Peracchi Barcelos (from 12 September)
 Santa Catarina: Celso Ramos (until 12 September); Ivo Silveira (from 12 September)
 São Paulo: Ademar de Barros (until 6 June); Laudo Natel (from 6 June)
 Sergipe: Celso Carvalho (until 31 January); Lourival Baptista (from 31 January)

Vice governors
 Alagoas: Manoel Sampaio Luz 
 Bahia: Orlando Moscoso 
 Ceará: Joaquim de Figueiredo Correia (until 12 September); Humberto Ellery (from 12 September)
 Espírito Santo: Rubens Rangel (until 5 April); vacant thereafter (from 5 April)
 Goiás: Osires Teixeira (from 31 January)
 Maranhão: Alfredo Salim Duailibe (until 31 January); Antonio Jorge Dino (from 31 January)
 Mato Grosso: Jose Garcia Nieto (until 31 January); Lenine de Campos Póvoas (until 31 January)
 Minas Gerais: Clóvis Salgado da Gama (until 31 January); Pio Soares Canedo (from 31 January)
 Pará: Agostinho de Meneses de Monteiro (until 31 January); João Renato Franco (from 31 January)
 Paraíba: André Avelino de Paiva Gadelha (until 31 January); Antônio Juarez Farias (from 31 January)
 Paraná: Plínio Franco Ferreira da Costa 
 Pernambuco: vacant
 Piauí: João Clímaco d'Almeida 
 Rio de Janeiro: vacant thereafter (from 12 August)
 Rio Grande do Norte: Teodorico Bezerra (until 31 January); Clóvis Motta (from 31 January)
 Santa Catarina: 
 until 31 January: Armindo Marcílio Doutel de Andrade
 31 January-19 July: Francisco Roberto Dall'Igna
 from 19 July: vacant thereafter
 São Paulo: Laudo Natel (until 6 June); vacant thereafter (from 6 June)
 Sergipe: vacant

Events 
 5 February – Institutional Act Number Three (AI-3) is issued. It introduces indirect elections for governors and vice-governors and the appointment of mayors.
 21 February – Pelé marries Rosemeri dos Reis Cholbi (divorced 1982). 
 5 June – Adhemar de Barros, governor of São Paulo, is removed from the post and has his political rights revoked by president Castelo Branco.
 6 June – Luís Carlos Prestes, leader of the Brazilian Communist Party, is sentenced to 14 years in prison.
 25 July – A bomb attack attempting to assassinate presidential candidate Artur da Costa e Silva at Recife International Airport causes 3 deaths and several wounds.
 20 August – The Lead Masks Case – the corpses of two electronic technicians wearing lead masks are found near Rio de Janeiro in advanced state of decomposition. The case of their death has never been determined and was subject to much speculation.
 3 October – An indirect presidential election takes place. Artur Costa e Silva is elected the next President of Brazil by 295 congress votes.

Births 
 18 January - André Ribeiro, racing driver
 2 April – Supla, musician
 2 July – Rigan Machado, 8th degree red and black belt from  Brazilian Jiu-Jitsu
 12 July – Mendonça Filho, ex-governor of Pernambuco
 12 December – Royce Gracie, martial artist

Deaths 
 15 May – Venceslau Brás, 98, 9th President of Brazil (b. 1868)

References

See also 
1966 in Brazilian football
1966 in Brazilian television

 
1960s in Brazil
Years of the 20th century in Brazil
Brazil
Brazil